The 2018 Tro-Bro Léon was a one-day road cycling race that took place on 15 April 2018. It was the 35th edition of the Tro-Bro Léon and was rated as a 1.1 event as part of the 2018 UCI Europe Tour. It was also the eighth event of the 2018 French Road Cycling Cup.

The race was won by Christophe Laporte.

Teams
Nineteen teams were invited to take part in the race. These included two UCI WorldTeams, eleven UCI Professional Continental teams and six UCI Continental teams.

Result

References

External links

2018 UCI Europe Tour
2018 in French sport
2018